Dan Reed Network is an American funk rock band formed in 1984 by Dan Reed in Portland, Oregon. They released several albums during the mid-to late 1980s and scored a top 40 hit on the Billboard Hot 100 in 1988.

History

Formation
Dan Reed (born 1963 in Portland, Oregon) met Dan Pred in high school in Aberdeen, South Dakota, and after a time pursuing music studies at Northern State University, the pair returned to Portland and formed the Dan Reed Network in 1984. In 1986, they made their first recording, a six-track EP called Breathless which spawned a No. 1 single, "Steal Me", on Z-100 in Portland, Oregon.

The lineup at this point was Dan Reed on vocals and guitar, Brion James on guitar, Melvin Brannon II on bass guitar, Dan Pred on drums, and Rick DiGiallonado (formerly of Portland platinum rockers Quarterflash) on keyboards. The band's diverse ethnic and musical backgrounds (Reed is of German, Hawaiian, and Native American ancestry, James is of Jamaican ancestry, Brannon is African-American, Pred is Jewish and DiGiallonado is Italian-American) were reflected in the music, which, though discernibly hard rock, was blended with soul, funk, and jazz arrangements. DiGiallonado, who was married with one child, was replaced by Portlander Blake Sakamoto on keyboards; Sakamoto, of Japanese heritage, had returned from Los Angeles where he had been playing with future Atlantic Records artists Dear Mr. President (lead singer Julian Raymond moved on to be vice president of Capitol Records).

The Dan Reed Network made a name for itself with the live performances. The Washington Post described the band in one performance as "easily charming its ... audience with an unlikely brand of heavy metal-ish rock sharpened by junk funk and plenty of rock 'n' roll theatrics", and that "the Network's strength lies in its infectious temperament. "

Record deal
The band signed to Mercury Records with the aid of Derek Shulman (who was enjoying success with Bon Jovi and Cinderella), and were managed by Bill Graham. In winter 1987, the group released an eponymous debut album which was produced by Bruce Fairbairn (who had worked with Bon Jovi) and was engineered and mixed by Mike Fraser at Little Mountain Sound Studios in Vancouver. They released their first single "Ritual", which peaked at No. 38 on the Billboard Hot 100. The song also received a music video.

The Dan Reed Network album received positive reviews, not the least of which is a four-star write-up from Rolling Stone. Most reviews lauded the band's ability to blend elements of heavy funk with a gritty rock edge peppered with pop hooks, pulled together in a 1980s radio-friendly production. Rolling Stone wrote that "Producer Fairbairn deserves a nod for adding just the right amount of pop polish where it's needed", and giving even the weaker songs on a strong album an appeal. Still, while People magazine's review of the album as being "polished to a brassy sheen" saw the glass half-full, some music critics saw Fairbairn's pop-savvy commercial production as minimizing the band's funk grooves and heavy rock guitar. Newsday (New York) said "the songs don't stand up to repeated listenings due to Bruce Fairbairn's absurdly pristine production ... Fairbairn, best known for recordings by Loverboy, Aerosmith, and Bon Jovi, is a master at neutering hard rock and rendering it antiseptic." The Washington Post approached the issue with a constructively balanced context, comparing the Dan Reed Network's debut album to its live performances, saying, "numbers such as 'Get to You,' irritatingly synth-heavy on the record, were played with enough soul and engagingly invidious guitar to redeem them."

The poor promotion of the Dan Reed Network's debut album impeded the band's traction in the United States market. Def Leppard's album Hysteria (1987) was having disappointing sales at Mercury/Polygram and the label was pulling support from new artists to focus on saving the British rock band's return to the scene. Ironically, it would be Def Leppard's managers Cliff Burnstein and Peter Mensch who would offer the Dan Reed Network the final leg of the Hysteria tour in the US if they would switch to their management company, Q Prime. The band was initially reluctant to jettison Bill Graham, but by the beginning of 1989, they signed with Q Prime and the band enjoyed its greatest success.

1989–1997
While at the Rock 'n' Roll Hall of Fame induction ceremony in January 1989, Dan Reed met up with Nile Rodgers. The second album, Slam, produced by Rodgers, better represented the Dan Reed Network's live sound and accelerated the band's growing status in Europe. However, the new collection did less well in North America, due to internal problems at Mercury/Polygram.

The band toured Europe and the UK in the winter of 1989/1990 to support Bon Jovi. The success of this tour led to the Rolling Stones selecting the band as their main support for their first tour in almost 10 years. The Steel Wheels/Urban Jungle Tour of Europe and the UK, in the summer of 1990, had the band playing to tens of thousands nightly in stadiums, where their showmanship and musicianship fired up the crowd in anticipation of the Rolling Stones. The relationship later led to Sakamoto working as the Stones' road manager.

The Dan Reed Network's third album, The Heat (1991), was their biggest success in the UK, but their American record label still had not figured out how to promote the band. The label was unhappy that Reed had shaved off his long dark hair, which they had viewed as a prime marketing attraction. The band soldiered on without tour support from Mercury/Polygram, including a stint supporting the Baby Animals in Australia, and what would be their final tour through Europe and the UK in the summer of 1993. In October 1993, the band members were starting to take different paths in their lives but agreed to go on a hiatus and not officially break up.

A live album called Live at Last (Halfway Around the World) was released in 1997. This album was compiled from hundreds of hours of tapes from keyboardist Blake Sakamoto. He and drummer Dan Pred auditioned several versions of each song to comprise a comprehensive 2-CD live set. A companion video, filmed live in Portland on New Year's Eve of 1991, also called Live at Last, was released as well.

Reunion
Dan Reed Network played a one time only reunion show on New Year's Eve 2012 with all original band members on stage. The band announced on January 12, 2013, that they will play further concerts together in both the US and Europe. That culminated at their first UK show for two decades, headlining the Enchanted Festival at Greenwoods Spa, Chelmsford on October 12, 2013. The band reunited Saturday, November 9 in Portland, OR at the Roseland Theater.

Anthology
In 2013, the Dan Reed Network teamed up with Pledge music on a new compilation album. This album was to include live versions of many songs and was a double CD set with online access and various other special options. The tracks being chosen by band members. The funding achieved 143% and the album was shipped to all supporters in late January 2014. It is now also available through online music stores.

Fight Another Day
Following the success of the compilation album, Anthology, the band returned to the studio to produce a new album of original material. The band lineup changed slightly in that Blake Sakamoto was otherwise busy and in his place, a new Keyboardist, Rob Daiker, joined the "Network". The album Fight Another Day was released by Frontiers Music SRL on June 3, 2016, to favorable reviews from fans and critics alike. This was followed with a world tour in 2016 and then a further European tour early in 2017. According to Dan Reed, the band wasn't satisfied with the labels promotion work for the album, so they decided not to work with them anymore.

Origins
In 2018 the band brought out a new album, consisting of a mix of new tracks and older ones, which were newly recorded. It was released by AOR Heaven/Soulfood. The album was recorded in different studios in Manchester, New York, Portland, and Stockholm.

Let’s Hear It For The King
In late 2019, the band went on tour in Europe and the UK to play anniversary shows of the album Slam. At the same time, the band produced a new album in Portland.  According to Dan Reed, it will be a funky and heavy album, which will provide probably the best songs the band recorded in the last years since the reunion. 

The Dan Reed Network album "Let’s Hear It For The King" will be released by Drakkar Entertainment on March 4, 2022. The single/video "Starlight"  was released October 22, 2021.

Dan Reed
Reed continued to work solo and in collaboration with other musicians, including Nuno Bettencourt, of the band Extreme. Like Bettencourt, Reed capitalized on occasional opportunities to act in theater and film but continued to explore his musical identity in directions that took some former fans by surprise.

Reed lent his vocals to a 1990 rap-rock collaboration with the basketball team Portland Trail Blazers, "Bust a Bucket".

In the mid-1990s, Dan Reed formed a new band and released a record called Adrenaline Sky in 1998. The first half of the record was recorded in a studio, while the second half contains live recordings from the 1996 concert. Musically the record is different from Reed's previous work in his funk rock band Dan Reed Network as the songs are written in the style of alternative rock and grunge. 
Reed released an EP called Sharp Turn in 2004, available through iTunes and MSN Music. This four-track EP is in an electronica style, a sharp contrast from the music of the Dan Reed Network. 
Reed actively toured Europe and the US during the second half of 2008 and continues to do so in 2009. Selections from these live, solo acoustic shows appear on An Evening with Dan Reed, available at shows and at his official website. The setlists at these shows vary from classic DRN material ("Ritual", "Stronger Than Steel", "I'm So Sorry", "The Salt of Joy", "Long Way to Go", "Lover") to new material from the forthcoming album ("Coming Up for Air", "Losing My Fear").

Coming Up for Air, a solo album by Reed, was released in 2010. The first video mixes Charlie Chaplin footage from The Great Dictator (1940) with new footage of Dan Reed over a backdrop of social, natural, and political imagery.

In May 2009, Reed played a number of UK shows, including a house concert in York.

In 2010, Reed (with a newly assembled band) performed a series of shows throughout Europe. The March 5 performance at Union Chapel in London was professionally filmed for release as an upcoming DVD. The show featured a mixture of new material from Coming Up For Air as well as some classic DRN hits.

On February 26, 2013, Dan Reed released his second solo album, Signal Fire.

On March 31, 2015, Dan Reed released his third solo album called Transmission. This album was crowdfunded via Pledge Music.

On September 14, 2017, Dan Reed's latest solo album called Confessions was released via Zero One Entertainment.

In his private life, he left the US because of political reasons. After spending a year in India and three in Jerusalem, where he built a recording studio, he moved to Paris for 3 years. 2011 he moved to Prague, where he started a family and lives since then.

Members
Current
Dan Reed – vocals, guitars, piano (1984–1993, 2012–present)
Brion James – guitars (1984–1993, 2012–present)
Melvin Brannon II – bass (1984–1993, 2012–present)
Dan Pred – drums, percussion, electronics (1984–1993, 2012–present)
Rob Daiker – keyboards (2015–present)

Former
Jeff Siri – keyboards (1984–1985)
Rick DiGiarllonado – keyboards (1985–1987)
Blake Sakamoto – keyboards (1987–1993, 2012–2015)

Discography

Dan Reed Network

Singles

Dan Reed
 Adrenaline Sky (1998)
 Sharp Turn (EP, 2004) Universal Music Enterprises/UMG
 An Evening with Dan Reed (2009)
 Coming Up for Air (2010)
 Studio Sessions - Dan Reed and Rob Daiker Live in the Studio (DVD, 2010)
 Signal Fire (2013)
 Transmission (2015)
 Confessions (2017)

References

Sources
 "Picks and Pans", People Magazine, April 4, 1988.
 Wayne Robins, "On the Reed Network", Newsday (New York), May 14, 1988.
 Alona Wartofsky, "The Dan Reed Network", The Washington Post, May 27, 1988.
 Kim Neely, "Album Reviews: Dan Reed Network", Rolling Stone, August 11, 1988.

External links

 Official website
 Band fan site
 Dan Reed's website
 Dan Reed Network Discography at Discogs.com
 Dan Reed Discography at Discogs.com

Musical groups from Portland, Oregon
Funk rock musical groups
1984 establishments in Oregon
1993 disestablishments in Oregon
Musical groups established in 1984
Musical groups disestablished in 1993